Ramone Cooper (born 3 May 1988 in Waratah, New South Wales) is an Australian freestyle skier, specializing in  moguls.

Cooper competed at the 2010 Winter Olympics for Australia. He did not advance to the moguls final, placing 27th in the qualifying round.

As of March 2013, his best showing at the World Championships is 15th, achieved in three events, twice in 2007 and once in 2009.

Cooper made his World Cup debut in February 2005. As of March 2013, his best finish is 8th, in moguls event at Lake Placid in 2007/08. His best World Cup overall finish is 33rd, in 2007/08.

References

1988 births
Living people
Olympic freestyle skiers of Australia
Freestyle skiers at the 2010 Winter Olympics
People from Newcastle, New South Wales
Australian male freestyle skiers
Sportsmen from New South Wales